The Left-Handed Woman is a 1978 West German drama film directed by Peter Handke. It was based on Handke's own novel. It was entered into the 1978 Cannes Film Festival.

Cast
 Edith Clever as Marianne
 Bruno Ganz as Bruno
 Bernhard Minetti as The father
 Bernhard Wicki as The publisher
 Angela Winkler as Franziska
 Rüdiger Vogler as The actor
 Michael Lonsdale as The waiter
 Jany Holt as Woman in the meeting place
 Gérard Depardieu as Man with the T-shirt

References

External links

1978 films
1978 drama films
German drama films
West German films
1970s German-language films
Films based on works by Peter Handke
Films directed by Peter Handke
Films with screenplays by Peter Handke
1970s German films